A  is the Japanese reading of Chinese xing-xing or its older form sheng sheng (translated as "live-lively"), which is a mythical primate, though it has been tentatively identified with an orangutan species.

Some Western commentators have regarded the shōjō sea spirit with a red face and hair and a fondness for alcohol as part of native Japanese folklore. However, shōjō as sea-dwelling spirit was a fictional setting in the Noh play Shōjō, a possible embellishment of the Shan Hai Jing stating this orangutan could be found on a particular seaside mountain. And liquor-drinking was always associated with this beast in China since antiquity.

Nomenclature 
The Chinese characters are also a Japanese (and Chinese) word for orangutan, and can also be used in Japanese to refer to someone who is particularly fond of alcohol.

A Noh mask called the shōjō exists (cf. §Noh); also, in Kabuki, a type of stage makeup (kumadori) is called the shōjō.

Development of lore 
The shōjō has been represented as a sea spirit with a red face and hair and a fondness for alcohol as part of Japanese folktale tradition.

It has sometimes been misconceived as purely native Japanese folklore and superstition, particularly by commentators of the netsuke craft art, since the shōjō as a popular for these carvings. Though the conception of the shōjō as an alcohol-loving fairy living in the sea may have passed into folklore, it has its antecedent in the medieval literature or theater, namely the Noh play Shōjō, which is set in Ancient China, which in turn derives from the Chinese counterpart, xingxing:

There is no question whatsoever that shōjōs love of liquor derives from the xingxing of Chinese literature, and a number of ancient sources can be listed. The being dwelling in the sea is a uniquely Japanese adaptation, but it might have ben inspired by the statement in the Shan Hai Jing that it is found on a southern mountain bordering the sea.

Xingxing 

The xingxing (xīng xīng) written shengsheng (shēng shēng) in older writings is found in a number of pieces of Chinese literature, dating back to several centuries B.C.

Shan hai jing 
The shengsheng or xingxing, also given the English-translated name of "live-lively" are mentioned in three passages of the Shan Hai Jing ("Classic of Mountains and Seas").

According to Book One, or Classic of the Southern Mountains the shengsheng resembles a yu or long-tailed ape, but has white ears. It is said to crouch while walking, but to be able to run like humans, and eating it imparts quick-running ability. It is said to inhabit Mount Zhaoyao 招摇之山 or "Raiseshake", which is the first peak of Queshan 鵲山 or Mount Magpie [range].

Elsewhere:

The Chinese character Birrell translates as "green" (青, qīng) is also used to refer to colors that in English would be considered "blue," (see Distinguishing blue from green in language) and that illustrator Sun Xiao-qin (孫暁琴, Sūn Xiǎo-qín), in Illustrated Classics: Classic of Mountains and Seas (经典图读山海经, Jīng Diǎn Tú Dú Shān Hǎi Jīng) chose to portray the xīng xīng from this same passage as having blue fur.

Bencao Gangmu 
The xingxing is mentioned in the Bencao Gangmu ("Compendium of Materia Medica", 1596), and identified as referring to the orangutan by modern editors/translators. The work's compiler Li Shizhen remarked that xing-xing was formerly written sheng sheng, hence, Unschuld emends the authentic pronunciation of "" to be "sheng sheng". Curiously, Strassberg did the opposite, and rendered "" as xingxing.

The Bencao Gangmu describes it as resembling a dog or [rhesus] macaque, having yellow fur like the ape (yuan), and white ears like a pig.

It cites Ruan Qian from the Tang dynasty period regarding the method the Vietnamese locals in Fengxi county used to capture the xingxing. They would leave straw sandals and liquor by the roadside to lure them; the creatures examine these goods but go away at first, but they return to try on the sandals and drink the wine, at which point they can be captured. When it comes time to eat one of them, they would push the fattest one forward, and they weep.

Japanese literature and art

Noh play 

The Kyōgen-influenced Noh play shōjō is set in Ancient China, specifically on the banks of the Xunyang River (present-day Jiujiang) in Morokoshi (唐土; present-day Jiangxi Province).

Plotline 

A man is instructed to sell wine (sake) at the market to become wealthy. The protagonist (shite) shōjō disguised as human buys from him in large quantity, but his face never becomes flushed despite the heavy drinking. The sake-seller who has turned wealthy asked his great patron for his identity, and the shōjō reveals to him he is a spirit living in the sea. 

The sake-seller seller seeks out the spirit at an estuary by the seaside. The shōjō appears in its true form, drinks the sake, getting drunk and dancing ecstatically, then rewarding the sake seller by making his sake vat perpetually refill itself.

Costume 
The Shōjō Noh mask with a red tinge on its face, it is worn by the lead (nochishite) playing its part of the shōjō, and used exclusively for this lead role, but nowhere else. The costume of the Shōjō follows an overall red-color theme, a big red wig, and red clothing.

Variant 
The variant to the Noh play, known by the title Shōjō midare or simply  is actually only involves alternate choreography or staging (in Noh jargon).

Folk art 
The Shōjō doll was sometimes displayed alongside the red Daruma doll, red paper gohei, etc. on a altar to the  during the Edo Period. The Shōjō doll was a hariko (papier-mâché) like the daruma, and the industry for manufacture is said to date to the c. 1700s or earlier (Genroku era). It was considered a lucky item (engimono), placed on the hearth (kamado), and was supposed to contract the pox in place of the family.

The shōjō has also been a popular subject for the  Nara ningyō, which is a type of wood-carved doll that is color-painted.

Wakan sansai zue 

Terajima Ryōan's encyclopedia Wakan sansai zue  (1712) included and entry for "shōjō", with illustration (cf. fig. right). The caption was accompanied by the Chinese pronunciation rendered in katakana (suin suin ), but also claims a Japanese name shōjō (written ). It is clear the entry draws from Chinese sources, especially the Bencao Gangmu, and its prefacing remarks argues that the beast is actually yellow-furred (as the Bencao Gangmu states), rather being red color as has been believed according to popular notions in Japan.

The opening text proper states that the shōjō is known to occur in the mountains and valleys, in the land of the Ailauyi (a people in western Yunnan) and "Fengxi xian" ( county) in Jiaozhi (present-day Northern Vietnam), but the beast occurring in Fengxi, Vietnam was already given in the Bencao Gangmu, as aforementioned. And the local Vietnamese strategy of leaving straw sandals (zōri) and wine (sake) in order to lure the orangutan for capture, is also taken almost verbatim from the Chinese source.

Folklore

White sake 

A group of shōjō as sake-loving sea spirits are featured in a Japanese folktale entitled "White saké" published by Richard Gordon Smith (1908). It occurs in an anthology which, folklorist A. R. Wright was convinced, faithfully recorded tales substantially as they were told by the oral sources, whether "fishermen, peasants, priests, or others".

A summary is as follows: A gravely sick man had a dying wish to drink sake. His son searched near Mount Fuji and met the red shōjō, who were having a drinking party on the beach. The shōjō gave him some sake after listening to his plea. Since the sake revived the dying father, the son went back to the spirit to get more sake each day for five days. A greedy neighbor who also wanted the sake became sick after drinking it. He forced the son to take him to the shōjō to get the good sake. The shōjō explained that as his heart wasn't pure, the sacred sake would not have life-restoring benefits, but instead had poisoned the neighbor. The neighbor repented, and the shōjō gave him some medicine to cure him. The father and the neighbor brewed white sake together.

Popular culture 

Several plants and animals have shōjō in their names for their bright, reddish-orange color. Examples include several Japanese maple trees, one of them named shōjō-no-mai or "dancing red-faced monkey" and another named shōjō nomura or "beautiful red-faced monkey." Certain bright reddish-orange dragonflies are named , meaning "red-faced dragonfly." Other names with shōjō refer to real or fancied connections to sake, like the fly  that tends to swarm around open saké.

In Hayao Miyazaki's animated film Princess Mononoke, talking, ape-like creatures struggling to protect the forest from human destruction by planting trees are identified as shōjō.

Shōjō appeared in a 2005 Japanese film The Great Yokai War.

The Japanese artist Kawanabe Kyōsai, who was also known for his heavy drinking and eccentric behavior, humorously referred to himself as a shōjō.

The March 30, 2012, episode of the television series Supernatural, "Party on, Garth", features a shōjō, although this shōjō appears to have features more associated with the onryō.

See also

Inari
Kami
Yōkai
List of legendary creatures from Japan

Explanatory notes

References
Citations

Bibliography

External links 
The Obakemono Project

Japanese mythology
Chinese legendary creatures
Male characters in theatre
Tutelary deities
Noh
Kabuki characters
Japanese legendary creatures
Classic of Mountains and Seas